Next to Nothing is the second studio album by American rapper Rittz. The album was released on September 9, 2014, by Strange Music. The album features guest appearances from Twista, Yelawolf, Trae tha Truth, Mike Posner, B.o.B, Shawty Fatt, and Scar.

Background
In a June 2014 interview with AllHipHop, Rittz spoke about the album, saying he would rap about his own life, and tried to maintain his own artistic style to please his fans and avoid compromising it for financial success.

Critical response

Next to Nothing received positive reviews from music critics. Jay Balfour of HipHopDX praised Rittz's flow and fast rapping, though took issue with some "déjà vu moments and first-time misses". Jeffrey Whaley of XXL praised many of the tracks as "standout" and characterized the album as having "replay value" and working "sonically from beginning to end."

Commercial performance
The album debuted at number 14 on the Billboard 200, with first-week sales of 21,627 copies in the United States. It also debuted at number 3 on both Rap Albums and Top R&B/Hip-Hop Albums charts. The album has sold 62,000 copies in the United States as of April 2016.

Track listing

Personnel
Credits for Next to Nothing adapted from the album liner notes.

 Richie Abbott – publicity
 The Avengerz – producer
 B.o.B – featured artist
 Tom Baker – mastering
 Craig Balmoris – producer
 Brent Bradley – internet marketing
 Violet Brown – production assistant
 Freddie "Scender" Burman – associate producer, A&R, artist management
 Valdora Case – production assistant
 Chico – additional vocals
 Toli Collins – additional vocals
 Jared Coop – merchandising
 Glenda Cowan – production assistant
 Ben "Bengineer" Cybulsky – mixing
 DJ Chris Crisis – scratches
 DJ Tight Mike – engineering
 Penny Ervin – merchandising
 Five Points Music Group – producers
 Braxton Flemming – merchandising
 Candice Freeman – additional vocals
 Adam Geron – street marketing
 Ben Grossi – project consultant, general management
 Marry Harris – merchandising
 Matthew Hayes – mixing
 Chad Hess – photography
 Jeremy Jones – associate producer, A&R, artist management
 Kato – producer
 Corbin King – producer
 Robert Lieberman – legal
 Lifted – producer
 Korey Lloyd – production assistant, project management
 Matic Lee – producer
 L. David McCollum – guitar
 Jeff Nelson – internet marketing
 Cory Nielsen – production assistant
 Julian Nixon – producer
 Nvisible Design – art direction & design
 Dawn O'Guin – production assistant
 Travis O'Guin – executive producer, A&R
 Lucas Parker – guitar, bass guitar
 Mike Posner – featured artist
 Jose Ramirez – street marketing
 Mark Reifsteck – booking
 Reklis Beatz – producer
 Rittz – primary artist
 Victor Sandoval – internet marketing
 Scar – additional vocals
 Seven – producer
 Brian Shafton – project consultant, general management
 Shawty Fatt – primary artist
 T. Stoner – producer
 Tasha P – additional vocals
 Kaitlyn Topperwein – street marketing
 Trae tha Truth – featured artist
 Track Bangas – producers
 Twista – featured artist
 Josie Wahl – additional vocals
 Daniel Watson – engineering
 Dave Weiner – associate producer, A&R
 WLPWR – producer
 Yelawolf – featured artist

Charts

Weekly charts

Year-end charts

References

2014 albums
Rittz albums
Strange Music albums
Albums produced by WLPWR
Albums produced by Seven (record producer)